Utkarsh Verma is an Indian politician and a member of the 16th Legislative Assembly in India. He represents the Lakhimpur constituency of Uttar Pradesh and is a member of the Samajwadi Party political party. He won his first Assembly election at the age of just 25, and became 2010 India's youngest MLA.

Early life and education
Utkarsh Verma was born in Lakhimpur Kheri district. He attended the ITS Engineering College and competed PGDM course.

Political career
Utkarsh Verma has been a MLA for one term. He represented the Lakhimpur constituency and is a member of the Samajwadi Party political party. Utkarsh Verma was elected to the Vidhansabha from Lakhimpur Sadar in a by-election of 2010 and retained his seat in 2012.

Posts held

See also
 Lakhimpur (Assembly constituency)
 Sixteenth Legislative Assembly of Uttar Pradesh
 Uttar Pradesh Legislative Assembly

References 

1985 births
Living people
People from Lakhimpur Kheri
People from Uttar Pradesh
Samajwadi Party politicians
Uttar Pradesh MLAs 2012–2017